is a former Japanese  professional baseball pitcher. He played for the Fukuoka Daiei Hawks/Fukuoka SoftBank Hawks , Yokohama BayStars, Orix Buffaloes and Tokyo Yakult Swallows of the Nippon Professional Baseball(NPB).

On September 17, 2019, Terahara announced his retirement.

On October 31 2022, The Fukuoka SoftBank Hawks announced that Terahara will take over as pitching coach from the 2023 season

References

External links

 NPB.com

1983 births
Living people
Fukuoka Daiei Hawks players
Fukuoka SoftBank Hawks players
Japanese baseball players
Nippon Professional Baseball pitchers
Orix Buffaloes players
Baseball people from Miyazaki Prefecture
Tokyo Yakult Swallows players
Yokohama BayStars players
Japanese baseball coaches
Nippon Professional Baseball coaches